Dexter Gymnasium is a historic gymnasium located at Dexter, Stoddard County, Missouri.  It was built in 1939-1940 during the Great Depression on a block donated to the local school system, and shares the block with a school and library. It is a rectangular two-story, Art Deco-style, reinforced concrete and brick building. It measures 88 feet by 96 feet and has a gentle geodesic arch roof. "The 
fourteen "ziggurat"-styled support columns or buttresses, seven each along the north and south facades,
with their incised vertical lines, are an excellent example of this Art Deco style."

The school district built a new gymnasium in 1960, and this building was adapted for community use. In 1996 the school district donated the building and property to the city. It was listed on the National Register of Historic Places in 2001.

References

Event venues on the National Register of Historic Places in Missouri
Art Deco architecture in Missouri
Sports venues completed in 1940
Buildings and structures in Stoddard County, Missouri
National Register of Historic Places in Stoddard County, Missouri
Sports venues on the National Register of Historic Places in Missouri